Wilton “Hook” Davis (March 3, 1929 – January 15, 2004) was an American football player.  He played college football for Hardin–Simmons University. He led the NCAA major colleges in rushing yardage with 1,173 rushing yards in 1947.  In 1948, he ranked fifth in rushing yardage with 889 yards and an average of 6.59 yards per carry.  With Davis as the leading ground-gainer and Warren B. Woodson as head coach, Hardin-Simmons compiled a 14-5-3 record from 1947 to 1948.

See also
 List of college football yearly rushing leaders

References

1929 births
2004 deaths
American football halfbacks
Hardin–Simmons Cowboys football players
People from Robertson County, Texas
Players of American football from Texas